The Baltic–Adriatic Corridor or Baltic–Adriatic Axis is a European initiative to create a high capacity north–south railway and road corridor connecting Gdańsk on the Baltic Sea with Bologna and the Adriatic. The line traverses Poland, the Czech Republic, Slovakia, Austria and Italy, connecting heavily industrialized areas such as Warsaw and the Upper Silesian Coal Basin, Vienna and south-east Austria, and Northern Italy. It developed from the Trans-European Transport Network (TEN-T) project No. 23 of a Gdańsk-Vienna railway axis set up in 2003. Carrying 24 million tons of freight per year, the Baltic–Adriatic Corridor is considered among the most important trans-Alpine lines in Europe.

History
Following an initiative by the Austrian transportation ministry in 2006, Poland, the Czech Republic, Slovakia, Austria and Italy signed a Letter of Intent to expand the TEN-T railway project 23, in order to form the Baltic–Adriatic Corridor. The goals of the initiative were to eliminate bottlenecks, create intermodal linking of traffic flows and connect with other European main corridors, eliminate structural and geographical disadvantages for under-served areas (such as the southern Austrian states of Styria and Carinthia), increase the competitiveness of rail with roadway (truck) transport and to realize the market development potentials of passenger traffic along the corridor.

14 European countries signed a declaration calling for implementation of the Baltic–Adriatic Corridor between Gdańsk and Bologna in 2009. It is expected to be operational by 2025. In 2012 construction of the Semmering Base Tunnel started, expected to open in 2030, bypassing the gradients of the Semmering Pass.

By resolution of 19 October 2011, the Baltic Adriatic Corridor was linked with the TEN-T Rail Baltica project from Warsaw via Kaunas, Riga and Tallinn to Helsinki (including the proposed Helsinki to Tallinn Tunnel).

Railway lines
Gdańsk Główny railway station – Warszawa Wschodnia railway station (Polish State Railways PKP rail line 9) 
Warszawa Centralna – Grodzisk Mazowiecki (PKP rail line 1, former Warsaw–Vienna railway)
Grodzisk Mazowiecki – Zawiercie (PKP rail line 4) 
Zawiercie – Katowice (PKP rail line 1)
Katowice – Czechowice-Dziedzice (PKP rail line 139)

Vienna - Graz (Southern Railway)

Areas served
 Gdańsk Bay with the seaports of Gdańsk and Gdynia
 Warsaw metropolitan area, with connection to Rail Baltica
 Łódź
 Upper Silesian Industrial Region (Katowice) and adjacent North Moravia (Ostrava)
 Olomouc urban zone
 Brno metropolitan area
 Vienna metropolitan area (the city and surrounding Lower Austria), with connection to the Magistrale for Europe
 Bratislava
 Styria, the city of Graz, and Carinthia
 Trieste and Udine in the Friuli-Venezia Giulia region
 Veneto  with (Venice and Padua)
 Emilia-Romagna  with Bologna and Ravenna
 Marche (Ancona)

References

TEN-T Core Network Corridors
Rail transport in Europe